Will Cherry (born February 8, 1991) is an American professional basketball player for MHP Riesen Ludwigsburg of the German Basketball Bundesliga (BBL). He played college basketball for the University of Montana, where he was named Big Sky Conference Defensive Player of the Year in 2012 and 2013. Cherry had a short stint in the NBA with the Cleveland Cavaliers before playing in Lithuania, Germany, Turkey, Croatia, Greece and Italy.

High school career
Cherry attended McClymonds High School in Oakland, California. As a senior, he averaged 12.0 points, 8.0 rebounds, 5.0 assists, and a league-leading 4.0 steals per game for the undefeated (33–0) Warriors, going on to be named league and team MVP.

College career
In 116 career collegiate games for the Montana Grizzlies (104 starts), Cherry averaged 12.8 points on .430 shooting with 3.6 rebounds, 3.4 assists, and 2.3 steals in 30.7 minutes per game. He was named first team All-Big Sky Conference three times, was the Big Sky Defensive Player of the year in 2011–12 and 2012–13, and is seventh on the school's all-time scoring list with 1,484 points.

Professional career

2013–14 season
After going undrafted in the 2013 NBA draft, Cherry joined the New Orleans Pelicans for the 2013 NBA Summer League. On February 13, 2014, he was acquired by the Canton Charge of the NBA Development League.

2014–15 season
In July 2014, Cherry joined the Cleveland Cavaliers for the 2014 NBA Summer League. On August 3, 2014, he signed with the Toronto Raptors. However, he was later waived by the Raptors on October 25, 2014. On November 2, 2014, Cherry was reacquired by the Canton Charge. Later that day, he signed with the Cleveland Cavaliers. On November 30, 2014, he was waived by the Cavaliers after appearing in eight games and averaging 1.9 points and 1 assist per game. On December 7, 2014, Cherry signed with Žalgiris Kaunas of Lithuania for the rest of the season. On June 6, 2015, he helped Žalgiris win their fifth straight LKL championship.

2015–16 season
In July 2015, Cherry joined the San Antonio Spurs for the 2015 NBA Summer League. On September 1, 2015, he signed with Alba Berlin of Germany for the 2015–16 season. With Alba, he won the German Cup in 2016.

2016–17 season
In August 2016, Cherry signed with Gaziantep Basketbol of the Turkish Basketball Super League.

2017–18 season
On July 29, 2017, Cherry signed with Croatian team Cedevita Zagreb for the 2017–18 season.

2018–19 season
On October 8, 2018, Cherry signed with the Golden State Warriors. He was waived three days later. He was added to the Warriors’ G League affiliate, the Santa Cruz Warriors. In 46 games played for the Warriors, he averaged 9.1 points, 4.2 assist and 1.6 steals per game.

2019–20 season
On April 13, 2019, Cherry signed with Olympiacos of the Greek Basket League for the rest of the season. On July 23, 2019, Cherry signed a one-year contract extension with Olympiacos. On January 15, 2020, Cherry and Olympiacos officially parted ways. He signed with Pallacanestro Reggiana of Lega Basket Serie A (LBA) on January 26.

2021–22 season
In 2021, Cherry played one game for Hapoel Eilat of the Israeli Basketball Premier League. On September 29, 2021, he signed with Cluj of the Romanian Liga Națională. On October 30, 2021, Cherry signed with Skyliners Frankfurt of the German Basketball Bundesliga.

2022–23 season
On December 29, 2022, he signed with MHP Riesen Ludwigsburg of the German Basketball Bundesliga (BBL).

Career statistics

NBA

Regular season

|-
| style="text-align:left;"| 
| style="text-align:left;"| Cleveland
| 8 || 0 || 8.6 || .263 || .222 || .500 || .6 || 1.0 || .8 || .1 || 1.9
|- class="sortbottom"
| style="text-align:left;"| Career
| style="text-align:left;"|
| 8 || 0 || 8.6 || .263 || .222 || .500 || .6 || 1.0 || .8 || .1 || 1.9

EuroLeague

|-
| style="text-align:left;"| 2014–15
| style="text-align:left;"| Žalgiris
| 15 || 6 || 18.5 || .395 || .368 || .708 || 2.4 || 1.7 || 1.0 || .1 || 7.1 || 6.3
|- class="sortbottom"
|-
| style="text-align:left;"| 
2019–20
| style="text-align:left;"| Olympiacos
| 13 || 5 || 21.0|| .431 || .364 || .667 || 2.0 || 1.7 || 0.8 || .1 || 5.4 || 4.3
|- class="sortbottom"
| style="text-align:left;"| Career
| style="text-align:left;"|
| 28 || 11 || 19.7|| .419 || .367 || .690 || 2.2 || 1.7 || 0.9 || .1 || 6.3 || 5.4

Personal life
Cherry is the son of Yvette Martin, and has a younger brother, Marsean.

On April 27, 2013, Cherry was arrested for disorderly conduct and resisting arrest after he was involved in a fight in front of Stockman's Bar in Missoula, Montana.

References

External links

 Will Cherry at euroleague.net
 Will Cherry at nbadleague.com
 Montana Grizzlies bio
 

1991 births
Living people
Alba Berlin players
American expatriate basketball people in Croatia
American expatriate basketball people in Germany
American expatriate basketball people in Israel
American expatriate basketball people in Lithuania
American expatriate basketball people in Turkey
American men's basketball players
Basketball players from Oakland, California
BC Žalgiris players
Canton Charge players
Cleveland Cavaliers players
Gaziantep Basketbol players
KK Cedevita players
Montana Grizzlies basketball players
Olympiacos B.C. players
Point guards
Santa Cruz Warriors players
Skyliners Frankfurt players
Undrafted National Basketball Association players